Franz Islacker (3 February 1926 – 1 July 1970) was a German football player. He is most notable for scoring a hat-trick for Rot-Weiss Essen in the final of the 1955 German football championship against Kaiserslautern. He was the father of Frank Islacker and the grandfather of Mandy Islacker.

Honours

 DFB-Pokal - 1953
 German football championship - 1955

External links

1926 births
1970 deaths
Footballers from Essen
Association football forwards
German footballers
Germany international footballers
VfR Mannheim players
Rot-Weiss Essen players
West German footballers